Timochares ruptifasciata, the brown-banded skipper, is a species of spread-wing skipper in the butterfly family Hesperiidae. It is found in the Caribbean Sea, Central America, and North America.

The MONA or Hodges number for Timochares ruptifasciata is 3941.

Subspecies
These two subspecies belong to the species Timochares ruptifasciata:
 Timochares ruptifasciata runia Evans, 1953
 Timochares ruptifasciata ruptifasciata

References

Further reading

 

Pyrginae
Articles created by Qbugbot
Butterflies described in 1884